Greyfriars, Stamford was a Franciscan friary  in Lincolnshire, England. It was one of several religious houses in Stamford suppressed in the Dissolution of the Monasteries.

From documentary evidence the Franciscan Friary was established before 1230, as Henry III made it a grant of fuel 13 January 1229-30. The Friary  was suppressed in 1534, and surrendered in 1538.

Joan of Kent, wife of the Black Prince was buried in 1385 at the Greyfriars beside her first husband, Thomas Holland, 1st Earl of Kent, as requested in her will.

Richard, Duke of York, was killed at the Battle of Wakefield in 1460 but his body was exhumed in 1476 by his son, Edward IV. The elaborate funeral cortège travelled from Pontefract to a new tomb at Fotheringhay.  En route the hearse spent two nights at the Greyfriars church.

Other burials
Blanche of Lancaster, Baroness Wake of Liddell

The Gatehouse

The only possible remaining building from the Friary is a gatehouse, now in the hands of Stamford Hospital, founded as Stamford and Rutland Infirmary in 1828, on the site of the Friary.   This building was long known as "Whitefriars gatehouse" but academic research in the late 20th century now suggests the Franciscans were on this site. It was built of Barnack limestone in the second quarter of the 14th century.

The gate is on the Heritage at Risk Register; repairs have been carried out but there is not yet a re-use for the building.

See also
St Leonard's Priory, Stamford

References

Further reading

Royal Commission on Historical Monuments (England) (1977) An inventory of historical monuments: the town of Stamford: pp. 33–34

Monasteries in Lincolnshire
Buildings and structures in Stamford, Lincolnshire
Stamford